The 12135⇋12136 Nagpur–Pune Express is a Superfast Express train belonging to Indian Railways – Central Railway zone that runs between  and  in India.

It operates as train number 12135 from Pune Junction to Nagpur Junction and as train number 12136 in the reverse direction, serving the state of Maharashtra.

Coaches

The 12135⇋12136 Nagpur–Pune SF Express has one AC 2 tier coach, six AC 3 tier coaches, eleven Sleeper coaches, two General Unreserved coaches and two SLR (Seating Luggage Rack) coaches. It does not carry a pantry car.

As is customary with most train services in India, coach configuration may be amended at the discretion of Indian Railways depending on demand.

Service

As the average speed of the train is above , Indian Railway rules require a Superfast surcharge..

Routeing

Traction

The train is hauled by a Bhusawal loco shed-based WAG 5 end to end.

Operation

12135 Nagpur–Pune Express runs from Pune Junction every Tuesday, Thursday & Sunday reaching Nagpur the next day.

12136 Nagpur–Pune Express runs from Nagpur Junction every Monday, Wednesday & Saturday reaching Pune Junction the next day.

Major stoppage

See also

 Pune–Nagpur Garib Rath Express
 Dedicated Intercity trains of India

References

External links
 http://railenquiry.in/fare/12135/PUNE/NGP/3A/Pune-Nagpur-Express

Transport in Nagpur
Transport in Pune
Express trains in India
Rail transport in Maharashtra
Railway services introduced in 2003